α-Methylstyrene (AMS) is an organic compound with the formula C6H5C(CH3)=CH2. It is a colorless oil.

Synthesis and reactions
AMS is a precursor to plasticizers, resins, and polymers.  

AMS and acetophenone are byproducts formed in a variation of the cumene process.  It can also be produced by dehydrogenation of cumene.

The homopolymer obtained from this monomer, poly(α-methylstyrene), is unstable, being characterized by a low ceiling temperature.

References

Isopropenyl compounds
Benzene derivatives
Monomers
IARC Group 2B carcinogens